The Afghan rupee was the currency of Afghanistan in the late 19th and early 20th centuries. The rupee was subdivided into 60 paisa, each of 10 dinar. Other denominations issued included the shahi of 5 paisa, the sanar of 10 paisa, the abbasi of 20 paisa, the qiran of  rupee and the tilla and later the amani, both of Rs. 10/-.

Before 1891, silver rupees circulated with copper falus and gold mohur. The three metals had no fixed exchange rate between them, with different regions issuing their own coins. That year, a new currency was introduced, based on the Kabuli rupee and replacing both that and its Kandahari variant. The rupee was replaced in 1925 by the Afghani, but continued to be in circulation until 1978.

The rupee itself was first issued by Pashtun monarch Sher Shah Suri during his rule of northern India in the sixteenth century; India still uses its own variant of the rupee (along with Pakistan - see Pakistani rupee - since its creation in 1947), whereas Afghanistan does not.

Banknotes
In 1919 following Amanullah Khan's accession to the throne, Treasury notes were introduced for the first time in denominations of Re. 1/-, Rs. 5/-, Rs. 10/-, Rs. 50/- and Rs. 100/-. Text on the note was written in Persian only.

Coins

References

External links

Modern obsolete currencies
Currencies of Afghanistan
1925 disestablishments
1891 establishments by country